L'Église du Précieux Sang (also known as The Church of the Precious Blood (in French) is a historic Roman Catholic church complex at 94 Carrington Avenue and 61 Park Avenue in Woonsocket, Rhode Island, within the Diocese of Providence.

Description

 94 Carrington Avenue

The church, a High Victorian Gothic polychrome (but predominantly red) brick structure, was designed by the Worcester, Massachusetts architects E. Boyden & Son.  Construction began in 1873 and halted in 1875. It quickly resumed under a new pastor, but much of the building was destroyed in a severe storm in 1876.  Rebuilding began soon after, and the building was finally dedicated in 1881. A rectory was built along with the church. Originally a Second Empire style wooden building, it was remodeled in brick to designs by local architect Walter F. Fontaine in 1917.

The church tower was originally only completed up to the third stage, and it remained so until around 1910, when it was completed to designs by Fontaine.

 61 Park Avenue

In 1894–95, a convent and school, the Jesus-Marie Convent and Academy, was built at the corner of Park and Carrington. The architect is unknown, but the building is similar to other late designs by Boyden. The school was tripled in size in 1911. In 1927, a large chapel addition was built onto the convent, designed by Fontaine. At the same time, he designed a high school for the church on Greene Street. The site is now a parking lot. The complex had since been sold, and is now a senior housing development called Chateau Clare.

The church complex was added to the National Register of Historic Places in 1982.

Notable interments 

 Aram J. Pothier, Governor of Rhode Island

See also

 Catholic Church in the United States
 Catholic parish church
 Index of Catholic Church articles
 National Register of Historic Places listings in Providence County, Rhode Island
 Pastoral care

References

External links
 
 National Register of Historic Places Nomination Form
 
 Official site of the Holy See

19th-century Roman Catholic church buildings in the United States
Churches in the Roman Catholic Diocese of Providence
French-Canadian culture in Rhode Island
Churches on the National Register of Historic Places in Rhode Island
Roman Catholic churches completed in 1873
Buildings and structures in Woonsocket, Rhode Island
Churches in Providence County, Rhode Island
National Register of Historic Places in Providence County, Rhode Island
Cemeteries in Rhode Island